Shane Peacock is a Canadian novelist, playwright, journalist, and television screenwriter. His first book The Great Farini was a biography of the colourful Canadian personality William Leonard Hunt. His plays have been produced by the 4th Line Theatre; his documentaries have included Team Spirit, aired on the CTV national network, and among his novels are Last Message, part of the Seven Series for young readers; Double You, its sequel; and Separated, its prequel.

His best-selling series for young adults, The Boy Sherlock Holmes, has been published in ten countries in twelve languages and has appeared on more than forty shortlists. It won the prestigious IODE Violet Downey Book Award, two Arthur Ellis Awards for crime fiction, the Ruth and Sylvia Schwartz Children's Book Award, the Libris Award, and has been a finalist for the Governor General's Literary Award and three times nominated for the TD Canadian Children's Literature Award. As well, each novel in the series was named a Junior Library Guild Premier Selection. His first picture book, The Artist and Me, appeared in 2016 and quickly became a Junior Library Guild selection, Blue Spruce Award and Marilyn Baillie Picture Book Award nominee. His teen Gothic horror trilogy, The Dark Missions of Edgar Brim, begun in 2016, became a John Spray Mystery Award nominee and was followed in early 2018 by Monster.

Bibliography

Novels

The Dark Missions of Edgar Brim
The Dark Missions of Edgar Brim (2016)
Monster (2018)
Demon (2019)

The Boy Sherlock Holmes

Eye of the Crow (2007)
Death in the Air (2008)
Vanishing Girl (2009)
The Secret Fiend (2010)
The Dragon Turn (2011)
Becoming Holmes (2012)

The Dylan Maples Adventures

The Mystery of Ireland's Eye (1999)
The Secret of the Silver Mines (2001)
Bone Beds of the Badlands (2002)
Monster in the Mountains (2003)
Phantom of Fire (2019)

Picture Books

   1. "The Artist and Me" (2016)

HistoryThe Great Farini: The High Wire Life of William Hunt (1995)Unusual Heroes (2002)

PlaysThe Great Farini, 4th Line Theatre (1994)The Devil and Joseph Scriven, 4th Line Theatre (1999, 2000)The Art of Silent Killing'', 4th Line Theatre (2006)

References

External links
 Author's Website

1957 births
Living people
Canadian children's writers
People from Kapuskasing
Canadian male novelists
Writers from Ontario